The 2012–13 New Orleans Privateers men's basketball team represented the University of New Orleans during the 2012–13 NCAA Division I men's basketball season. The Privateers led by second year head coach Mark Slessinger, played their home games at Lakefront Arena and played as an independent. They finished the season 8–18. This was the Privateers last year as an independent as they will join the Southland Conference in July 2013.

Roster

Schedule

|-
!colspan=9| Regular Season

References

New Orleans Privateers men's basketball seasons
New Orleans
2012 in sports in Louisiana
2013 in sports in Louisiana